Sogbini Chiefdom is a chiefdom in Bonthe District of Sierra Leone. Its chiefdom headquarter  is Tihun. Farming is the major economic production in the chiefdom. The Sherbro people make up the overwhelming majority of the population of Sogbini Chiefdom. The current President of Sierra Leone Julius Maada Bio, is a native of Sogbini Chiefdom, and an ethnic Sherbro himself.

References 

Chiefdoms of Sierra Leone
Southern Province, Sierra Leone